HSwMS Munin was a coastal destroyer of the Royal Swedish Navy, built by Öresundsvarvet and launched on 27 May 1942 as the third of the four-ship . The ship was the only member of the class to be built by Öresundsvarvet in Landskrona. Joining the Coastal Fleet in January 1943, Munin served during World War II and then, after the conflict, visited Belgium, France, Ireland, Norway and the United Kingdom in 1946 and 1947. In 1953, the vessel was upgraded with enhanced anti-submarine armament, being re-rated a frigate. After twenty-five years service, the ship was decommissioned on 6 December 1968 and sold for scrap the following year.

Design

Munin was a Swedish destroyer based on the  designed in Italy. Small and ideal for coastal operation, the design was a cheaper alternative to traditional designs to meet the requirements of the rapidly expanding Swedish Navy. The class was named after things related to Thor beginning with the letter M, Munin being one of his ravens. Displacement was  standard and  full load. A crew of 100 officers and ratings was carried.

Machinery consisted of two Penhoët A oil-fired boilers, which supplied steam to two de Laval geared steam turbines, each driving its own propeller.

The main armament consisted of three  K/50 M42 guns produced by Bofors. These were placed in separate mounts, one on the fore deck, one on the aft deck and one on the aft superstructure. Air defence consisted two  K/60 M36 and two  K/66 M40 individually mounted anti-aircraft autocannons, also provided by Bofors. Three torpedo tubes for  torpedoes were triple mounted aft of the superstructure and two depth charge throwers were mounted further towards the stern. 42 mines could also be carried for minelaying.

Service
Munin was laid down by Öresundsvarvet in Landskrona in September 1941, the only member of the class to be constructed at the yard. Launched on 27 May 1942, the vessel was commissioned on 3 January the following year and delivered to the Navy five days later, serving with the Coastal Fleet through World War II. The ship was allocated the pennant number 31.

After the War, Munin took part in two goodwill tours to other European nations. In 1946, the vessel accompanied the cruiser  and destroyer  on a tour of Bergen and Fannefjord in Norway, Dublin in Ireland and Antwerp in Belgium. The following year, the ship accompanied the cruiser  and lead ship of the class  on a trip to France and the United Kingdom. The fleet visited Le Havre, Lyme Bay, Torquay, Glasgow and Oban.

Modernisation
Munin was modernised in 1953 and re-rated as a frigate. One of the  main guns was removed, along with the triple  torpedo tubes.  Instead a single Squid depth charge launcher was fitted to improve anti-submarine capabilities and the  guns were upgraded to provide greater anti-aircraft protection. After the conversion, Munin retained minelaying capability. The upgraded ship was allocated the pennant number 75.

Disposal
Munin was decommissioned on 6 December 1968 and was sold for scrap in Gothenburg the following year.

References

Citations

Bibliography

 
 
 
 
 
 
 

 

1942 ships
Mode-class destroyers
Ships built in Landskrona
World War II naval ships of Sweden